Edemar Cid Ferreira (born 31 May 1943) is a former Brazilian economist, banker, and art collector. He was the founder and head of Banco Santos, which went bankrupt in September 2005. Ferreira was convicted in Brazil of bank fraud, tax evasion, and money laundering. He began serving 21-year prison sentence in December 2006. As part of the case, a judge ordered the search, seizure and confiscation of assets that were acquired with illegally obtained funds from Banco Santos. Ferreira assembled a 12,000-piece art collection while he controlled Banco Santos. Before his arrest, he smuggled his collection out of Brazil. The United States government seized items from a storage facility in New York that didn't comply with customs laws. They returned Basquiat's Hannibal painting, a Roy Lichtenstein, a painting by Joaquin Torres Garcia, a Serge Poliakoff and other works with an estimated value of $20 million to $30 million.

References

1943 births
Brazilian economists
Brazilian bankers
Living people
Brazilian art collectors
People convicted of fraud
People convicted of money laundering
People convicted of tax crimes